The Trial of Draža Mihailović et al., or the Belgrade Process (Serbo-Croatian: Beogradski proces / Београдски процес), was the 1946 trial of Draža Mihailović and a number of other prominent convicted collaborators for high treason and war crimes committed during World War II. 

Mihailović was tried as a leader of the Chetnik movement during World War II (the "Yugoslav Army in the Fatherland", JVUO). His co-defendants were other prominent figures of the movement and members of the Yugoslav government-in-exile, such as Slobodan Jovanović, along with members of ZBOR and of the Nedić regime like Velibor Jonić. The trial opened on June 10, 1946, before the Military Council of the Supreme Court of the Federal People’s Republic of Yugoslavia, and lasted until July 15, 1946. The trial opened in the presence of about 60 foreign journalists. The court was located in the Summer Hall of the Infantry Training School at Topčider in Belgrade.

In 2015, a Serbian court rehabilitated Mihailović and overturned his conviction, ruling that it was a communist political show trial that was fundamentally and inherently unfair.

Indictment
The accused were tried before a military court. The President of the council was Mihailo Đordević and the members Milija Laković and Mihailo Janković, with Todor Popadić as secretary. The assistant judges were Nikola Stanković and Radomir Ilić. The prosecutor was Miloš Minić, a high-ranking government official who took part in Tito-Mihailović negotiations in 1941. The assistant prosecutor was Miloš Jovanović.

Mihailović and others were tried mainly for their activities against Allied forces, the Yugoslav Partisans, for collaboration with the Germans and for war crimes against civilians. Mihailović was indicted on 47 counts. He was found guilty of all charges and sentenced to death.

The Allied airmen he had rescued in 1944 were not allowed to testify in his favor. Only two women came to testify in favor of Mihailović. Reportedly, they were heckled by the audience and, after the trial, submitted to a professional interdiction. At the trial the witness that appeared were: Dušan Simović, Radoslav Đurić, Jovan Škavović, Miša Simović and Milan Grol.

Indictees

The accused were, in the order their names were read out at the trial:

Out of the twenty-four accused individuals mentioned above, ten were tried in absentia.

Foreign accreditation
Teams were sent by the agencies TASS, ČTK, PAP, Reuters, Associated Press, Agence France-Presse, United Press, Overseas News Agency, International News Service, the Jewish Telegraphic Agency, Tele Press, the Albanian Telegraphic Agency and the following newspapers: Pravda, Izvestia, The Times, the Daily Worker, The New York Times, the New York Herald Tribune, the News Chronicle, the Daily Express and others.

Verdict  

Mihailović is quoted as saying, in his final statement, "I wanted much; I began much; but the gale of the world carried away me and my work.".  "Gale of the world" is sometimes translated "Winds of War."

Verdict was read on 15 July 1946. Mihailović and ten others were sentenced to death by a firing squad (two in absentia). An appeal was rejected on 16 July and the nine were executed on 17 July. The others in the process were convicted to penalties ranging from 18 months to 20 years in prison.

Reactions 

The trial showed, according to historian Jozo Tomasevich, that Mihailović had never had firm and full control over his local commanders. A committee for the fair trial of General Mihailovic was set up in the United States, but to no avail. 

Diplomat and author Walter Roberts stated that the trial was "anything but a model of justice" and that "it is clear that Mihailović was not guilty of all, or even many, of the charges brought against him" though Tito would probably not have had a fair trial either, had Mihailović prevailed.

At the time of the trial, there were protests from the Americans and the French, although both were moderated by their interest in the new government.

According to Mihailović biographer Jean-Christophe Buisson, one of Mihailović's lawyers, Dragić Joksimović, was arrested a few days after the execution and died in prison under unclear circumstances.

Modern views
More recently, there have been calls for a retrial and/or rehabilitation. Momčilo Ninčić have been officially rehabilitated in 2006 and Slobodan Jovanović in 2007 by Serbia. In 2015, a Serbian court invalidated Mihailović's conviction. The court held that it had been a Communist political show trial that was controlled by the government. The court concluded that Mihailović had not received a fair trial. Mihailović was, therefore, fully rehabilitated.

Proceedings

References

Further reading
  chapter 10

External links 

Filmske Novosti documentary with some photos
PDF files of some original documents from the trial
Miodrag Zečević: DOKUMENTA SA SUÐENJA DRAŽI MIHAILOVIĆU – PDF files of original documents from the trial in serbocroatian
IZDAJNIK I RATNI ZLOČINAC DRAŽA MIHAILOVIĆ PRED SUDOM – stenographic notes from the trial in serbocroatian
DOKUMENTI O IZDAJSTVU DRAŽE MIHAILOVIĆA – book of documents of the yugoslav State commission for investigating war crimes on Mihailović

Yugoslav Serbia
Chetniks
World War II war crimes trials
1946 in Yugoslavia